Bhuja is the generic name for puffed rice interchangeably used for a snack mix that originated in some parts of India and is widely popular there. It is a spiced mix of crackers, dried noodles, dried peas, peanuts, and other dried nuts with the main ingredient being puffed rice. It is also commonly found in most British commonwealth supermarkets, sold under several brand names or even in the bulk foods aisle.

Bhuja is also called as Muurra/Murmura in most parts of India but its original name is bhuja. It's originally from Kantabanji, in the Indian state of Odisha in 1970. This snack is mostly found in Odisha, Bihar, some parts of Chhattisgarh, Uttar Pradesh, Maharashtra and Andhra Pradesh. In Balangir, Odisha, bhuja thela is found. In thela the mix corn chips, onion, padi, potato, groundnut and make the bhuja tasty.

It is commonly called Bombay Mix in Britain, where it is sold in many supermarkets and shops. It is also sold in public houses, often as an accompaniment to copious quantities of ale and lager.

References

Snack foods